Rokha District is a district of Panjshir Province, Afghanistan. The estimated population in 2019 was 25,461.

See also
 Districts of Afghanistan

References

Districts of Panjshir Province